Myro of Rhodes was a philosopher mentioned in the Suda. Her dates are uncertain, but she was probably Hellenistic at the earliest.

She was known in the ancient world for her commonplace book which collects women's sayings. It has not survived.

The full text of her Suda entry:
A Rhodian woman, a philosopher. [Wrote] sayings of women who were queens, and stories.

Notes

Ancient Greek women
Ancient Greek women philosophers 
Philosophers in ancient Rhodes
Quotation collectors